The 2014–15 Emporia State Lady Hornets basketball team represented Emporia State University in the 2014–15 NCAA Division II women's basketball season, which was the Lady Hornets' 41st basketball season. The Lady Hornets were led by head coach Jory Collins, who finished his fifth season at the helm of the Lady Hornets. The team played its home games on Slaymaker Court at William L. White Auditorium in Emporia, Kansas, its home court since 1974. Emporia State is a member of the Mid-America Intercollegiate Athletics Association.

Preseason outlook
On October 22, the MIAA released its Preseason Coaches Poll. On November 6, the Lady Hornets were ranked 7th in the nation. The Lady Hornets have finished in the top three of the MIAA or have advanced to the MIAA tournament championship game in each of the last 12 years and 16 of the last 17 years. On November 18, the Lady Hornets were picked No. 1 in the Central Region in the inaugural NCAA Division II Women's Basketball DII SIDA Regional Poll.

2014–15 Roster

Media
The Lady Hornets basketball games were broadcast on KFFX-FM, Mix 104.9.

Schedule
Source: 

|-
!colspan=12 style="background:#231F20; color:white;"|Exhibition

|-
!colspan=12 style="background:#231F20; color:white;"|Regular season

|-
!colspan=12 style="background:#231F20; color:white;"|2015 MIAA Tournament

|-
!colspan=12 style="background:#231F20; color:white;"|2015 NCAA Tournament

Rankings

References

Emporia State Lady Hornets basketball seasons
2014 in sports in Kansas
2015 in sports in Kansas